Estonia–Spain relations are the bilateral and diplomatic relations between these two countries. Both nations are members of the European Union, NATO and the United Nations.

In 2007 the number of Spaniards residing in Estonia stood at 54 people, while the number of non-resident Spaniards was 55.

History 
International relations between Spain and Estonia began in 1921, when Spain recognized the independence of the Republic of Estonia. On 24 August 1991 Spain once again recognized Estonia's independence from Soviet Union. Both countries established diplomatic relations on 10 September of the same year. On 3 December 1992 Spain established an Honorary Consular Office in Tallinn under the Spanish embassy of Helsinki, it was not until 2004 when it opened its own embassy in the capital Estonia. The first ambassador of Spain in Estonia was Miguel Bauzá y More, who held the position until 11 January 2008 when he was replaced by Eduardo Ibáñez López-Dóriga. For its part Estonia opened an embassy in Madrid in 1997, between 2000 and 2007 the ambassador was Andres Tomasberg, since 2007 the position is held by Andres Rundu. Currently, the relations between the two countries are framed within the scope of the European Union.

Economic relations 

Exchanges between Estonia and Spain have maintained an upward pace with a positive balance in favor of Spain which, in 2007, sold products to Estonia for a total of 120 million euro s while importing for a total of 54 million . The main imports from Estonia are composed of fuel and mineral oils, wood, charcoal, manufacturing sy steel and iron from smelting waste. While Spain's main exports are made up of automobiles, tractor is, ceramic products and edible fruits. 

On the other hand, the investments between both countries have reached a more even level, since although in 2006 Estonia only invested 6,100 euros in Spain the following year it did so for a value of 1,984,420 euros. In contrast, Spain in 2006 invested 1,022,170 euros while in 2007, it was reduced to 283,230.

At the end of 2008 the Estonian Hispanic Chamber of Commerce was established with headquarters in Tallinn.

Tourism 

The number of Spanish tourists traveling to Estonia has been increasing every year, in 2006 were 15,150 who spent the night at least one night in the country. However, most tourists visiting Estonia do so through cruise ships or from Helsinki on a round trip on the same day, so it is estimated that the number of Spanish visitors is much higher.

Estonia is present at the tourism fairs in Barcelona, EIBTM (since 2004) and Madrid, FITUR (since 2005). In addition, the airline Estonian Air has since 2006 a regular line between Tallinn and Barcelona.

Cultural relations 

Since 1996, Spanish studies can be taken at Tartu University, the most prestigious in the country. The University of Tallinn introduced this possibility in 2001 and since 2003 this university has an examination center of the Instituto Cervantes.

Agreements 

Estonia and Spain have signed the following agreements: in 1997 the Agreement on international road transport; in 1998 the Agreement for the Protection of Investments; in 1999 the Protocol of cooperation between the Ministries of Defense; in 2000 the Agreement on the reciprocal abolition of visas, the Agreement for the readmission of persons and the Agreement for the extradition of criminals; in 2005 the Agreement to avoid double taxation; and in 2007 the Agreement for the protection of classified information and the Agreement for cooperation in culture and education.

Resident diplomatic missions
 Estonia has an embassy in Madrid.
 Spain has an embassy in Tallinn.

See also  
 Foreign relations of Estonia 
 Foreign relations of Spain

References 

 
Spain
Estonia